Soot and Gold (Finnish: Nokea ja kultaa) is a 1945 Finnish drama film directed by Edvin Laine and starring Laine, Ansa Ikonen and Veli-Matti Kaitala.

Partial cast
 Ansa Ikonen as Sirkka Lehmus  
 Edvin Laine as Jalmari Aaltonen 
 Veli-Matti Kaitala as Risto Muuranen 
 Uuno Laakso as Ryyppy-Ville  
 Thure Bahne as Klaus Vaheri  
 Enni Rekola as Pirkit 
 Matti Aulos as Eemeli Virta  
 Arvi Tuomi as Major of the Salvation Army  
 Rafael Pihlaja as Police inspector  
 Jalmari Rinne as Siltanen  
 Evald Terho as Ruotu-Roope  
 Anni Rönkkö as Miina Laakso  
 Aku Peltonen as Esa Laakso  
 Vili Järe as Kemiläinen  
 Pirkko Raitio as Matron in Pelastusrengas  
 Einari Ketola as Sailor  
 Juhani Turunen as Kallu  
 Ritva-Leena as Liisa Lahtinen  
 Yrjö Sylberg as Esa's friend  
 Veikko Linna as Customs officer  
 Rauha Puntti as Saleswoman  
 Olavi Vepsäläinen 
 Aarne Orri as Joose  
 Edvin Ruotsalainen as Detective  
 Ossi Korhonen as Huttunen  
 Aarne Laine as Duty policeman  
 Toivo Lahti as Man in Pelastusrengas

References

Bibliography 
 John Holmstrom. The moving picture boy: an international encyclopaedia from 1895 to 1995. Michael Russell, 1996.

External links 
 

1945 films
1945 drama films
Finnish drama films
1940s Finnish-language films
Films directed by Edvin Laine
Finnish black-and-white films